Julio Peralta and Horacio Zeballos were the defending champions, but chose to compete in St. Petersburg instead.

Julien Benneteau and Édouard Roger-Vasselin won the title, defeating Wesley Koolhof and Artem Sitak in the final, 7–5, 6–3.

Seeds

Draw

Draw

References
 Main Draw

Doubles